Calvaria de Cima is a civil parish in the municipality of Porto de Mós, Portugal. The population in 2021 was 2,477, in an area of 10.11 km2.

References 

Parishes of Porto de Mós